Avundy is an old and rare Russian Christian male first name. It is derived from the Latin word abundo, meaning to be in abundance.

The patronymics derived from "Avundy" are "" (Avundiyevich), "" (Avundyevich; both masculine); and "" (Avundiyevna), "" (Avundyevna; both feminine).

References

Notes

Sources
Н. А. Петровский (N. A. Petrovsky). "Словарь русских личных имён" (Dictionary of Russian First Names). ООО Издательство "АСТ". Москва, 2005. 
А. В. Суперанская (A. V. Superanskaya). "Современный словарь личных имён: Сравнение. Происхождение. Написание" (Modern Dictionary of First Names: Comparison. Origins. Spelling). Айрис-пресс. Москва, 2005. 

